Tobias Giehl (born 25 July 1991 in Munich) is a German athlete specialising in the 400 metres hurdles. He won the gold medal at the 2009 European Junior Championships.

His personal best in the event is 49.48 seconds set in Mönchengladbach in 2016.

International competitions

References

1991 births
Living people
German male hurdlers
Sportspeople from Munich
Athletes (track and field) at the 2016 Summer Olympics
Olympic athletes of Germany